Lieutenant de vaisseau Le Hénaff (F789) is a  in the French Navy.

Design 

Armed by a crew of 90 sailors, these vessels have the reputation of being among the most difficult in bad weather. Their high windage makes them particularly sensitive to pitch and roll as soon as the sea is formed.

Their armament, consequent for a vessel of this tonnage, allows them to manage a large spectrum of missions. During the Cold War, they were primarily used to patrol the continental shelf of the Atlantic Ocean in search of Soviet Navy submarines. Due to the poor performance of the hull sonar, as soon as an echo appeared, the reinforcement of an ASM frigate was necessary to chase it using its towed variable depth sonar.

Their role as patrollers now consists mainly of patrols and assistance missions, as well as participation in UN missions (blockades, flag checks) or similar marine policing tasks (fight against drugs, extraction of nationals, fisheries control, etc.). The mer-mer 38 or mer-mer 40 missiles have been landed, but they carry several machine guns and machine guns, more suited to their new missions.

Its construction cost was estimated at 270,000,000 French francs.

Construction and career 
Lieutenant de vaisseau Le Hénaff was laid down in March 1977 at Arsenal de Lorient, Lorient. Launched on 16 September 1978 and commissioned on 13 February 1980.

On 5 March 2019, the ship left Brest with her 100 crew members for the Gulf of Guinea. There she will relieve the amphibious assault ship Mistral as part of the Corymbe 146 mission.

She was decommissioned on 31 July 2020.

Citations 

Ships built in Lorient
1978 ships
D'Estienne d'Orves-class avisos